Georg Østerholt    (13 December 1892 – 20 September 1982)   was a Norwegian ski jumper who competed in the 1920s. He won a bronze medal in the individual large hill at the 1926 FIS Nordic World Ski Championships in Lahti.

External links

1892 births
1982 deaths
Norwegian male ski jumpers
FIS Nordic World Ski Championships medalists in ski jumping
20th-century Norwegian people